Wyre Halt railway station was a station in Wyre Piddle, Worcestershire, England. The station was opened in 1934 and closed in 1966.

References

Further reading

Disused railway stations in Worcestershire
Railway stations in Great Britain opened in 1934
Railway stations in Great Britain closed in 1966
Former Great Western Railway stations
Beeching closures in England